A noun particle is any morpheme that denotes or marks the presence of a noun. They are a common feature of languages such as Japanese and Korean.

Korean particles

Korean noun particles are postpositional, following the word they mark, as opposed to prepositions which precede the marked word.

Korean noun particles include the subject particle i/ga, the object-marking particle eul/reul, and the topic-marking particle eun/neun, all of which show allomorphy.

Japanese particles

Like Korean, Japanese noun particles follow the noun being marked, and can serve any of several functions in a given sentence.
Example #1:  (Yesterday, I went to the supermarket.)
Kinō sūpā e ikimashita.
In this example, "e" is the noun particle for "sūpā" ("supermarket").  This particular noun particle denotes direction towards a place, being "supermarket."

Example #2:  (I ate pizza for lunch. lit. As for lunch, I ate pizza.)
Hirugohan wa watashi ga piza o tabeta.
The three noun particles ("wa," "ga," and "o") all serve different functions:
 "wa" - topic marker ("hirugohan" - lunch)
 "ga" - subject marker ("watashi" - I)
 "o" - object marker ("piza" - pizza)

References

Grammar
Linguistics
Parts of speech